Setubinha is a municipality in the northeast of the Brazilian state of Minas Gerais.  As of 2020 the population was 12,378 in a total area of 536 km².  The elevation is 729 metres.  It is part of the IBGE statistical microregion of Teófilo Otoni

The economy is based on cattle raising and agriculture, with the main crops being coffee, bananas, sugarcane, and corn.  As of 2005 there were no hospitals and 3 public health clinics.  In 2006 there were 14 primary schools and 2 middle schools.
List of municipalities in Minas Gerais

References

External links 
IBGE

Municipalities in Minas Gerais